Dariq Miller-Whitehead (born August 1, 2004) is an American college basketball player for the Duke Blue Devils of the Atlantic Coast Conference (ACC). He was a consensus five-star recruit and one of the top players in the 2022 class. As a senior, he was named national player of the year.

High school career
Whitehead attended Montverde Academy in Montverde, Florida. Whitehead won the Naismith Prep Player of the Year Award his senior year in 2022. He was selected to play in the 2022 McDonald's All-American Boys Game. Whitehead was named the McDonald's All-American Game MVP, where he had 13 points, seven rebounds, and seven assists.

Recruiting
Whitehead was a consensus five-star recruit and one of the top players in the 2022 class, according to major recruiting services. On August 1, 2021, he committed to playing college basketball for Duke over offers from Florida State, Kansas and NBA G League.

Career statistics

College

|-
| style="text-align:left;"| 2022–23
| style="text-align:left;"| Duke
| 26 || 6 || 20.1 || .408 || .411 || .885 || 2.4 || 1.0 || .8 || .2 || 8.1
|- class="sortbottom"
| style="text-align:center;" colspan="2"| Career
|| 26 || 6 || 20.1 || .408 || .411 || .885 || 2.4 || 1.0 || .8 || .2 || 8.1

Personal life
His brother, Tahir, played in the National Football League (NFL).

References

External links
Duke Blue Devils bio
ESPN profile
Montverde Academy Eagles bio
USA Basketball bio

2004 births
Living people
American men's basketball players
Basketball players from Newark, New Jersey
Duke Blue Devils men's basketball players
Small forwards